Mount Kupreanof is a stratovolcano on the Alaska Peninsula, United States. It is the largest and the northeasternmost in a group of five volcanoes opposite from Stepovak Bay. Mount Kupreanof displays extremely strong fumarole activity and its latest eruption in 1987 produced minor steam and ash emission. This is the only known historical eruption from Mount Kupreanof.

References

Volcanoes of Lake and Peninsula Borough, Alaska
Mountains of Lake and Peninsula Borough, Alaska
Mountains of Alaska
Volcanoes of Alaska
Stratovolcanoes of the United States
Active volcanoes